Rezball, short for "reservation ball," is a style of basketball associated with Native Americans, particularly at the high school level in the Southwestern United States, where many of the Indian reservations were created in the country.

Description
Rezball is transition-based basketball that forces tempo with aggressive play, quick scoring (or at least shooting) and assertive defense that looks to force turnovers through pressing or half-court traps. There are slight variations from program to program. Keys to a good rezball offensive play are sound fundamentals and being in very good condition. Many Native Americans adapted to basketball to bring them together with each other and is their way to overcome strife on the reservation.

History 
The Apache, Pueblo and Navajo tribes in northeastern Arizona and northwestern New Mexico are home to several high schools. In these areas basketball is very important. In Arizona, three of the top six largest crowds at a boys' basketball game are rezball games (regardless of school size), with one of the two games tied for the highest-ever attendance being a game between Apache and Navajo schools.

Arizona's Native American largest high school arenas are; The Nash Center (Kayenta, AZ) seats 3,800, The Warrior Pavilion (Tuba City, AZ) seats 4,518, the Ganado Pavilion (Burnside, AZ) seats 5,500, The Wildcat Den (Chinle, AZ) seats 7,510, and the Bee Hółdzil Fighting Scouts Events Center (Fort Defiance, AZ) seats about 6,532. These massive arenas draw large crowds from all around the Navajo Reservation. The border town teams for Arizona that are within the AIA 3A Division are Winslow, Holbrook and Page — which consists mainly of Native Americans. Some other examples of the intense following of basketball in this region were noted in February 2013 by a writer for MaxPreps.com, the high school arm of CBSSports.com. First, early in the month, the Wildcat Den hosted an Arizona Interscholastic Association (AIA) sectional tournament featuring four boys' and four girls' reservation teams. Even though neither Chinle High team participated in the sectional, more than 12,000 attended over the two-day event, with hundreds of fans arriving hours before the doors opened to get the best seats. The scheduling of the AIA's state tournament later that month at the venue then known as Jobing.com Arena in Glendale, home to the NHL's Arizona Coyotes, also reflected rezball influence. In most states that host multiple state championship games at one site, the last game scheduled is the boys' championship game in the largest enrollment class. Here, however, the marquee slot was reserved for the girls' title game in Class 3A (the state's largest schools are in Class 5A)—a classification that has traditionally been dominated by reservation schools.

New Mexico has produced many high schools that are nationally ranked by the National Federation of State High School Associations (NFHS) according to the New Mexico Activities Association (NMAA)--for producing over 100 State Championships combined, from numerous high schools. New Mexico functions each year on building tradition in basketball for both boys and girls. The big gyms in New Mexico from the Native American high schools are the Bronco Arena at Kirtland Central High School (Kirtland, NM) seats over 4,000, the Chieftain Pit at Shiprock High School (Shiprock, NM) seats 3,100, and the Pueblo Pavilion Santa Fe Indian School (Santa Fe, NM) seats 4,500. Both Shiprock and Kirtland Central have a unique glass going around the court. The border town teams for New Mexico are Kirtland Central, Gallup, and Santa Fe Indian—which consists mainly of Native Americans. New Mexico is well known around the country for its power houses in girls basketball such as from Kirtland Central, Shiprock, Gallup, Santa Fe Indian, Navajo Prep and Navajo Pine. Kirtland Central's girls basketball program leads with the most state championships than any other Native American high school. Shiprock has also impacted girls basketball and being major rivals with Kirtland Central. Gallup girls basketball program has been one of the most power houses in New Mexico, playing at a fierce level among larger/competitive high schools in New Mexico. Santa Fe Indian girls program has produced some great talents in the recent years along with Navajo Prep and Navajo Pine both have risen to many achievements. The New Mexico high school state finals takes place at The Pit on the University of New Mexico campus, and has had major sell outs starting from the late 80's from games between Shiprock and Kirtland Central girls. Many Native American fans from Gallup, Shiprock, Kirtland Central, Laguna Acoma and Santa Fe Indian continue to fill The Pit every year.

While the Native American basketball phenomenon is most pronounced in the Four Corners region, it is not limited to that area. For example, when the girls' team from the reservation high school of the Mississippi Band of Choctaw Indians reached the final of the Class 3A state tournament in 2017 (which they won), about 5,000 fans traveled from the reservation to Jackson for the game.

Native American Basketball Invitational (NABI)
Co-founded in 2003 by Mark West/former Phoenix Suns player, the late Scott Podleski/Arizona Rattlers and GinaMarie Scarpa/former Executive Director AC Green Youth Foundation (named for AC Green/NBA Iron Man).
Every year the NABI Foundation  host the Native American Basketball Invitational (NABI) in Arizona, an all native tournament sponsored by Nike N7, Ak-Chin Indian Community, Seminole Tribe of Florida, Gila River Indian Community, Phoenix Suns and Phoenix Mercury. In its 17th year, it has become recognized as the premier all Native youth tournament in the world and made history in 2007 as the first all Native tournament sanctioned by the NCAA after NABI Foundation President & CEO GinaMarie Scarpa insisted the NCAA respect Tribal Sovereignty and exempt the tournament from abiding to their "same state rule". The tournament hosts 128+ teams from all over the U.S., Canada and New Zealand, and is instrumental in showcasing the talent of the players to college recruiters, most of whom would not travel to the remote reservation towns to recruit. www.nabifoundation.org

High schools

Arizona 
Cibecue High School, Cibecue, Arizona 
Shonto Preparatory Technology High School, Shonto, Arizona 
St. Michael High School, St. Michaels, Arizona 
Salt River High School, Scottsdale, Arizona 
Rough Rock High School, Rough Rock, Arizona 
Baboquivari High School, Sells, Arizona 
Red Mesa High School, Teec Nos Pos, Arizona 
San Carlos High School, San Carlos, Arizona 
Piñon High School, Piñon, Arizona 
Valley High School, Sanders, Arizona 
Greyhills Academy High School, Tuba City, Arizona 
Hopi Junior/Senior High School, Keams Canyon, Arizona 
Many Farms High School, Many Farms, Arizona 
Alchesay High School, Whiteriver, Arizona 
Ganado High School, Ganado, Arizona 
Holbrook High School, Holbrook, Arizona
Winslow High School, Winslow, Arizona 
Window Rock High School, Fort Defiance, Arizona
River Valley High School, Mohave Valley, Arizona 
Tuba City High School, Tuba City, Arizona
Monument Valley High School, Kayenta, Arizona 
Chinle High School, Chinle, Arizona  
Page High School, Page, Arizona
Rock Point High School, Rock Point, Arizona 
Fort Thomas High School, Fort Thomas, Arizona

New Mexico 
Laguna-Acoma High School, Laguna, New Mexico 
Santa Fe Indian High School, Santa Fe, New Mexico 
Magdalena High School, Magdalena, New Mexico   
Tsé Yí Gai High School, Smith Lake, New Mexico 
Jemez Valley High School, Jemez Pueblo, New Mexico 
Pine Hill High School, Pinehill, New Mexico 
Navajo Pine High School, Navajo, New Mexico 
Navajo Prep High School. Farmington, New Mexico 
Dulce High School, Dulce, New Mexico 
Ramah High School,  Ramah, New Mexico 
Newcomb High School, Newcomb, New Mexico 
Crownpoint High School, Crownpoint, New Mexico 
Zuni High School, Zuni, New Mexico 
Wingate High School, Fort Wingate, New Mexico 
Rehoboth High School, Rehoboth, New Mexico 
Tohatchi High School, Tohatchi, New Mexico 
Thoreau High School, Thoreau, New Mexico 
Bloomfield High School, Bloomfield, New Mexico  
Shiprock Northwest High School, Shiprock, New Mexico 
Shiprock High School, Shiprock, New Mexico 
Kirtland Central High School, Kirtland, New Mexico 
Miyamura High School, Gallup, New Mexico 
Gallup High School, Gallup, New Mexico 
Piedra Vista High School, Farmington, New Mexico 
Farmington High School, Farmington, New Mexico 
Aztec High School, Aztec, New Mexico 
Native American Community Academy, Albuquerque, New Mexico

Elsewhere 
Sherman Indian High School, Riverside, California 
Wyoming Indian High School, Ethete, Wyoming 
Whitehorse High School, Montezuma Creek, Utah 
Ignacio High School, Ignacio, Colorado 
Monument Valley High School, Monument Valley, Utah 
Navajo Mountain High School, Navajo Mountain, Utah 
Uintah River High School, Duchesne, Utah

References

External links 

Native American Basketball Invitational website
http://www.nmact.org/
http://www.aiaonline.org/

Forms of basketball
Native American sports and games
Basketball in Arizona
Basketball in New Mexico
Basketball in California
Basketball in Wyoming
Basketball in Utah
Basketball in Colorado